The 1969 Pacific Tigers football team represented the University of the Pacific (UOP) in the 1969 NCAA University Division football season.

University of the Pacific was a charter member of the Pacific Coast Athletic Association. They had played as an Independent for the 20 previous seasons. The team was led by fourth-year head coach Doug Scovil, and played home games at Pacific Memorial Stadium in Stockton, California. They finished the season with a record of seven wins and three losses (7–3, 2–2 PCAA). The Tigers outscored their opponents 284–146 for the entire season, including three shutouts.

Schedule

Team players in the NFL
The following UOP players were selected in the 1970 NFL Draft.

Notes

References

External links
Game program: Pacific at Washington State – November 1. 1969

Pacific
Pacific Tigers football seasons
Pacific Tigers football